Bobby Jack Wright (born December 11, 1950) is a former American football coach. He was the assistant head coach, co-defensive coordinator, and secondary coach under Bob Stoops at the University of Oklahoma. He was originally hired at Oklahoma to recruit in the state of Texas. Prior to arriving at Oklahoma, Wright was an assistant coach at two high schools, head coach at one, and as assistant coach at the University of North Texas. In 1986, he was hired by the University of Texas to serve as an assistant. In 1997, Wright was promoted to defensive coordinator under John Mackovic. Wright has more Big 12 championship rings than any other player or coach in conference history.

References

External links
 Oklahoma profile

1950 births
Living people
North Texas Mean Green football coaches
Oklahoma Sooners football coaches
Texas A&M–Kingsville Javelinas football coaches
Texas Longhorns football coaches
Texas State Bobcats football players
High school football coaches in Texas
People from Mission, Texas
Players of American football from Texas